This page documents all tornadoes confirmed by various weather forecast offices of the National Weather Service in the United States during January, February, and March 2020. Tornado counts are considered preliminary until final publication in the database of the National Centers for Environmental Information.

United States yearly total

January

January 4 event

January 10 event

January 11 event

January 13 event

January 14 event

January 21 event

January 28 event

January 31 event

February

February 5 event

February 6 event

February 7 event

February 10 event

February 12 event

February 13 event

March

March 2 event

March 3 event

March 4 event

March 7 event

March 12 event

March 13 event

March 17 event

March 18 event

March 19 event

March 24 event

March 28 event

March 29 event

March 30 event

March 31 event

See also
 Tornadoes of 2020
 List of United States tornadoes from November to December 2019
 List of United States tornadoes in April 2020

Notes

References 

2020-related lists
Tornadoes of 2020
Tornadoes
Tornadoes
Tornadoes
2020, 1
2020 natural disasters in the United States
Tornadoes in the United States